Fournes-Cabardès is a commune in the Aude department in the Occitanie region in southern France.

Population

Its inhabitants are known as Fournois.

See also
Communes of the Aude department

References

Communes of Aude
Aude communes articles needing translation from French Wikipedia